The Walnut Grove School, on Walnut Grove Rd. near Caneyville, Kentucky, was built in 1911.  It was listed on the National Register of Historic Places in 1988.

It is a wood frame one-room schoolhouse  in plan.

References

One-room schoolhouses in Kentucky
School buildings on the National Register of Historic Places in Kentucky
National Register of Historic Places in Grayson County, Kentucky
School buildings completed in 1911
Schools in Grayson County, Kentucky
1911 establishments in Kentucky